Dubai Airport may refer to:
Dubai International Airport
Dubai World Central Airport